The Taçi Oil Cup (Albanian: Trofeu Taçi Oil) was an annual friendly football competition held in Albania. The competition took place in Tiranë between 2008 and 2010. The tournament was organized by Albanian businessman Rezart Taçi in cooperation with UNICEF from 2008 to 2010.

Editions

2008
In the inaugural match, Tirana faced then-FIFA Club World Cup winners Milan. Tirana won the match thanks to the screamers of Xhafaj and Muzaka, while the consolation goal for Milan came from Ronaldinho in the last moments of the match. The profits from the tickets went for charity.

2009
In the second edition, Albania national team faced Milan. The Rossoneri took a double-advantage thanks to the goals of Ronaldinho and Shevchenko, but Albania fired back by overturning the results with the strikers of Vila, Muzaka and Salihi in a period of 12 minutes. Milan, however, equalized in the 87th minute with the goal of Inzaghi. Then Milan claimed their 1st trophy by winning 5–4 in penalty shootouts, with Albania's Elvin Beqiri missing the decisive penalty.

2010
On 10 January, it was reported that Gramozi Ersekë (Rezart Taçi's city club) will face Spanish giants Real Madrid ten days later, thus leaving Milan for the first time outside the competition. Before the start of the match, a one minute of silence was held in the honour of Panajot Pano, who just died two days earlier. Xhafaj opened the score after only two minutes by heading a Marko dos Santos' cross, beating Dudek. However, Real bounced back and scored a header via Kaká, and then Benzema netted the winner nine minutes before the final whistle, making Real Madrid the third team to win the trophy.

Titles by club

Participation by club

Top goalscorers

See also
Independence Cup (Albania)
2011 SuperSport Trophy
Taçi Oil

References

International association football competitions hosted by Albania
Recurring sporting events established in 2008
2008 establishments in Albania